Ptyas nigromarginata, commonly known as the green rat snake, is a species of snake in the family Colubridae. The species is endemic to Asia.

Geographic range

P. nigromarginata is found in Bhutan, Nepal, India (Darjeeling, Sikkim, Assam), Northern Bangladesh, northern Myanmar (= Burma), Nagaland, China (Guizhou, Yunnan, southwestern Sichuan, southeastern Xizang [= Tibet]), and possibly northern Vietnam.

Description
Dorsally, it is green, with each dorsal scale edged in black. The top of the head is brownish. In adults, there are four broad black stripes on the posterior third of the body and on the tail. In juveniles the stripes extend the full length of the body and tail. Ventrally, it is greenish white.

Reproduction
P. nigromarginata is oviparous.

References

Further reading
Blyth E (1854). "Notices and Descriptions of various Reptiles, new or little known [part 2]". Journal of the Asiatic Society of Bengal, Calcutta 23 (3): 287–302. (Coluber nigromarginatus, new species, pp. 290–291).
David P, Das I (2004). "On the grammar of the gender of Ptyas Fitzinger, 1843 (Serpentes: Colubridae)". Hamadryad 28 (1 & 2): 113–116.
Jan G,  Sordelli F (1867). Iconographie générale des Ophidiens: Vingt-quatrième livraison. Paris: Baillière. Index + Plates I–VI (Coryphodon dhumnades [Jan non Cantor], Plate IV, Figure 1).
Lazell JD, Keirans JE, Samuelson GA (1991). "The Sulawesi Black Racer, Coluber (Ptyas) dipsas, and a Remarkable Ectoparasitic Aggregation". Pacific Science 45 (4): 355–361.
Lazell JD (1998). "Morphology and the status of the snake genus ″Ptyas″ ". Herpetological Review 29 (3): 134.

Colubrids
Reptiles described in 1854
Taxa named by Edward Blyth